Minaret College is the largest co-educational Islamic school in south-eastern Melbourne, Victoria, Australia. It was established in 1992 with 22 students on the grounds of a Noble Park mosque. As enrolment began to climb a new campus was established in Springvale, and later in 2009, another one in Officer and is opening a new campus in Doveton. Whilst the school is independent, a majority of its funding (>80%) came from the Australian and the Victorian governments.

Curriculum
The curriculum consists of the standard Victorian curriculum with extra religion-related subjects. Study of the Quran and Islamic religion is mandatory for all students until VCE (Year 11 and 12). 7-9 students are also given a choice between Arabic and Islamic history, as well as Zuhr prayer being mandatory for all students. The performance of the two campuses' student is usually around the Victorian state's average, however the Springvale campus usually performs better on national standardised tests.

See also

 Islam in Australia
 List of schools in Victoria
it is a very fun school

References 

Educational institutions established in 1992
Secondary schools in Melbourne
Islamic schools in Australia
Primary schools in Melbourne
1992 establishments in Australia
Buildings and structures in the City of Greater Dandenong